Gábor Péter Szabó (14 October 1902 – 26 February 1950) was a Hungarian footballer who played for Újpest FC, as well as representing the Hungarian national football team at the 1934 FIFA World Cup. He played 11 games and scored 6 goals for the Hungarian national team as a left winger.

P. Szabó won the 1929 Mitropa Cup and the 1930 Coupe des Nations with Újpest FC.

References

Hungarian footballers
Hungary international footballers
Újpest FC players
1934 FIFA World Cup players
1902 births
1950 deaths
Association football forwards